UAST may refer to:

Universal adaptive strategy theory, a theory describing the general limits to ecology and evolution.

Universities
University of Applied Science and Technology, a public university in Iran